The Oamaru Steam and Rail Restoration Society was formed in 1985 to preserve PWD 535. Since establishment the Society has acquired and preserved Hudswell Clarke built 0-4-0ST B10 of 1924 from the Pukeuri Alliance Freezing Works, a Robert Stephenson & Hawthorns shunter No.7908 of 1962 from the Pukeuri Alliance Freezing Works and TR 35 of 1939 from the New Zealand Railways Corporation. The society also currently has DSA 234 on loan to them by one of their members. The railway is located in Oamaru's Historic Precinct, utilising a portion of the former New Zealand Railways Oamaru yard. Train travels every Sunday from Harbourside Station to Quarry Siding located by the Oamaru Blue Penguin Colony, alongside Oamaru's Victorian Harbour.

Locomotives and rolling stock

Locomotives

In addition:
 The Ocean Beach Railway leased to the OS&RRS in 2009 their locomotive A 67 as a stand in for B10 while B10 was sidelined for its ten-year survey. It has since returned to the OBR.
 The OS&RRS had purchased DSA 218 in 1989 and it arrived the same year and hauled trains on the line. It was swapped for B10 along with DSA 234 in November the same year to the Waitaki NZ's (now Alliance) Pukeuri Freezing Works, Pukeuri. DSA 218 is now owned by the Ashburton Railway & Preservation Society and is awaiting restoration at The Plains Vintage Railway & Historical Museum.
 K 92 from the Waimea Plains Railway came to Oamaru Steam & Rail in early 2007 where it regularly operated on their open days as another stand in for B10. It was moved to the Kingston Flyer in 2008.
 B10's former Pukeuri stablemate, D16, briefly visited Oamaru Steam and Rail in December 2017 for the filming of an episode of the BBC TV series 'Coast New Zealand' with Neil Oliver, and to run public trains around the harbour. D16 is now a resident at the Pleasant Point Railway.

References

External links 
 

Heritage railways in New Zealand
Railway museums in New Zealand
Oamaru
1985 establishments in New Zealand